The minister of Labour is the minister of the Crown in the Canadian Cabinet who is responsible for the labour portfolio of Employment and Social Development Canada. From 2015 to 2019, the portfolio was included in that of the Minister of Employment, Workforce Development and Labour, but was split in 2019 during the government of Justin Trudeau.

History 
The Department of Labour was created in 1900. Previously, the responsibility for labour affairs was handled by the postmaster general.

The Department of Labour was created in 1900 through the efforts of postmaster general William Mulock and William Lyon Mackenzie King, becoming, respectively, the first minister and deputy minister. Until June, 1909, the postmaster general acted as minister of labour.

The Ministry of Labour oversaw a variety of issues, including union riots against immigration in 1907, post-war promotion of the federal Labour-Management Cooperation Service, and legislation surrounding the formation of unions.

In 1996, the Department of Labour was abolished, but the ministerial position continued within Human Resources Development Canada from 1996 to 2003 and Human Resources and Social Development Canada from 2003 to date.

From 1993 to 1996, the Department of Labour was amalgamated with the Department of Employment and Immigration to create Human Resources Development Canada. Although the intent was to replace two Cabinet posts with a single minister of human resources development, the desire to appoint "star candidate" Lucienne Robillard's to Cabinet in 1995 gave the position a reprieve from amalgamation—Robillard was given the title and positioned as a second minister inside HRDC, responsible for the Labour Program.

A December, 2003, reorganization had seen HRDC dismantled and labour responsibilities passing to a successor department, Human Resources and Skills Development Canada, again with two ministers: a minister of labour and a minister of human resources and skills development. The name change to Labour and Housing occurred seven months later. The Ministry of HRDC was reconstituted in February, 2006, as Human Resources and Social Development Canada, but still with two ministers.

In 2004, the portfolio was renamed from Labour to Labour and Housing.

From 2004 to 2006, the position was styled the minister of labour and housing, a name change corresponding with responsibility for the Canada Mortgage and Housing Corporation being transferred to the portfolio at that time. Minister of labour remains the title for legal purposes.

In 2015, the Labour portfolio was merged into the expanded ministry of Employment, Workforce, and Labour, gaining some responsibilities previously held by the minister of employment and social development. 

In 2019, following the 2019 Canadian federal election, the portfolio was split between the Minister of Labour and the Minister of Employment, Workforce Development and Disability Inclusion, with Filomena Tassi being appointed the new minister of Labour on November 20.

List of ministers

Key:

References

Ministers of Labour of Canada
Labour
Labour relations in Canada